The Sisters of Mercy of Verona  (Italian: Sorelle della Misericordia; Latin: Institutum Sororum a Misericordia Veronensium; abbreviation: I.S.M.) is a religious institute of pontifical right whose members profess public vows of chastity, poverty, and obedience and follow the evangelical way of life in common.

Their mission is primarily for the care of the sick in hospitals and subsequently for the education of youth. Their rule is based on that of st. Vincent de Paul.

This religious institute was founded in Verona, Italy, in 1840, by bd. Charles Steeb, with the help of bd. Luigia Poloni, the first superior, who assumed the name of "mother Vincent Mary". The institute received pontifical status in 1931.

The sisters have houses in Albania, Angola, Argentina, Brazil, Chile, Germany, Italy, Portugal, Tanzania. The Generalate of the Congregation can be found in Verona, Italy.

On 31 December 2008 there are 1029 sisters in 103 communities.

References

External links
 Sisters of Mercy official site

Catholic female orders and societies
Religious organizations established in 1840
Catholic religious institutes established in the 19th century
1840 establishments in Italy